The People's Deputies of Ukraine of the 6th convocation were elected in the snap parliamentary elections on September 30, 2007. The elections were held under the proportional system according to electoral lists of political parties and electoral blocks of political parties in Ukraine.

According to the results of early elections the following political forces got in the Verkhovna Rada:
 Party of Regions with 34.37% of votes
 Yulia Tymoshenko Bloc, BYuT with 30.71%
 Our Ukraine–People's Self-Defense Bloc with 14.15%
 Communist Party of Ukraine (CPU) with 5.39%
 Lytvyn Bloc with 3.96%

Together, these political forces gathered around 88.58% of the votes. All other political parties and blocks do not pass the electoral threshold of 3%. 2,73% of electors voted "against all".

The Party of Regions was allocated 175 seats in the parliament.

List

Overlimit members
Members that replaced the initially elected deputies who were dismissed from the position of People's Deputy of Ukraine.

References

External links
 List of elected People's Deputies of Party of Regions
 List of People's Deputies who surrendered their mandate

Parliamentarians of Party of Regions
2007-2012

6th Ukrainian Verkhovna Rada